Edward Chase Kirkland (May 24, 1894 – May 24, 1975) was an American historian. He was a professor of Economics History at Bowdoin College, and the president of the Organization of American Historians and the American Association of University Professors.

Early life
Kirkland was born in 1894. He was awarded the Croix de Guerre for his service in World War I.

Kirkland graduated from Dartmouth College, where he earned a bachelor's degree, and he earned a master's degree from the University of Cambridge, followed by a PhD from Harvard University.

Career
Kirkland taught History at Dartmouth College, the Massachusetts Institute of Technology (MIT) and Brown University. He was a professor of economics history at Bowdoin College from 1930 to 1959.

Kirkland was the author of several books. He received a Guggenheim Fellowship in 1955. He served as the president of the Organization of American Historians and the American Association of University Professors.

Personal life and death
Kirkland had a wife, Ruth, and a son, Edward. He resided in Thetford, Vermont.

Kirkland died on May 24, 1975 in Hanover, New Hampshire.

References

1894 births
1975 deaths
People from Thetford, Vermont
Dartmouth College alumni
Alumni of the University of Cambridge
Harvard University alumni
Dartmouth College faculty
MIT School of Humanities, Arts, and Social Sciences faculty
Brown University faculty
Bowdoin College faculty
20th-century American historians
20th-century American male writers
Recipients of the Croix de Guerre 1914–1918 (France)
American male non-fiction writers